Synanthedon pictipes, the lesser peachtree borer, is a moth of the family Sesiidae. It is known from the eastern half of Canada and the United States westward to Minnesota in the north and eastern Texas in the south.

The wingspan is 18–25 mm. Adults are black with a metallic sheen and whitish yellowish markings on the head and thorax and a narrow band on the abdomen. The wings are transparent. Males and females are similar, but males are more slender and have a finely tufted antenna. Adults emerge over the entire growing season, but peaking in spring and early summer. Spring generations emerge from early April to late July, while summer generations emerge from early July to November. There are two generations per year in the south and one (although sometimes a partial second) generation occurs in the north.

The larvae feed on peach, plum, cherry, beach plum and black cherry. Peach is the major cultivated plant host and the principal native wild plants attacked are cherry and plum. The larvae usually establish in bark cavities around wound margins and may infest old uninjured trees that have rough bark. Cytospora species cankers are particularly favorable for invasion. When development is completed, larvae construct cocoons to pupate.

References

Sesiidae
Moths described in 1868